Ashari Danudirdjo (3 November 1922 – 2 April 2010) was an Indonesian sailor. He competed in the Dragon event at the 1960 Summer Olympics.

References

External links
 

1922 births
2010 deaths
Indonesian male sailors (sport)
 Indonesian military personnel
Olympic sailors of Indonesia
Sailors at the 1960 Summer Olympics – Dragon
People from Semarang
20th-century Indonesian people